Rostagno is a surname. Notable people with the name include:

 Derrick Rostagno, a former professional tennis player from the United States
 Ippolita Rostagno, an Italian-American jewelry designer based in New York City
 Juan Rostagno, an Argentine sports shooter
 Victor Rostagno, an Uruguayan male artistic gymnast

Italian-language surnames